Matthias Hues (born 14 February 1959) is a German-born, naturalized American actor and martial artist. He was born in Waltrop, Germany, to Dr. Josef Hues and Maria Humperdinck Hues who still reside in Germany. Maria is the niece of Engelbert Humperdinck, composer of the opera Hansel and Gretel.  In 2019 he self-published his autobiography "Shirtless in Hollywood".

Life and Career
After graduating from school, Hues moved to Paris to enter hotel management. Once there, he joined a health club in Paris, which had just been bombarded with the new Jane Fonda aerobic exercise program from the United States. Hues recognized an opportunity and after returning to Germany, he opened two health clubs, flying in aerobic teachers from the USA.  During this time, he became obsessed with the American way of life and subsequently sold his clubs, boarding a plane to Los Angeles. 

He immediately joined Gold's Gym in Venice, California, the mecca of bodybuilding and entertainment personalities. Derek Barton, a former Hollywood stuntman and formerly one of Gold's managing directors, received a call from a producer who had just lost Jean-Claude Van Damme for his movie and needed a replacement. Barton sent Hues to test for the role, and he managed to convince the producers to give him the part despite having no prior acting experience. The movie, No Retreat, No Surrender 2 (1987), was a moderate success, and opened the door for Hues to make more films. 

His most commercially successful movie to date is I Come in Peace (1990) and he has played a variety of roles in his films, from a gladiator turned private investigator in Age of Treason (1993) to an aging hit-man in Finding Interest (1994), to a bumbling idiot trying to kidnap a rich kid in Alone in the Woods (1996), to a dancing lion tamer in Big Top Pee-wee (1988). He also played a Klingon general in Star Trek VI: The Undiscovered Country (1991). Hues is one of the few foreign actors who has lost his accent to the extent that many people in his own country are unaware he is from Germany.

Filmography

 1988 No Retreat, No Surrender 2: Raging Thunder as Yuri
 1988 Big Top Pee-wee as Oscar, The Liontamer
 1989 Fist Fighter as 'Rhino'
 1989 Cage as Italian Fighter
 1990 I Come in Peace as Talec, Bad Alien
 1990 Aftershock as Cassidy
 1991 Kickboxer 2: The Road Back as Neil Vargas
 1991 Diplomatic Immunity as Gephardt
 1991 Star Trek VI: The Undiscovered Country as Second Klingon General
 1992 I Don't Buy Kisses Anymore as Eric, Personal Trainer
 1992 Blackbelt as John Sweet
 1992 Mission of Justice as Titus Larkin
 1992 Talons of the Eagle as Khan
 1993 Bounty Tracker as Erik Gauss
 1993 TC 2000 as Bigalow
 1993 Fist Fighter 2 as C.J.Thunderbird
 1993 ‘’Age of Treason ‘’
 1994 Death Match as Mark Vanik
 1994 Finding Interest as The Hitman
 1995 Fists of Iron as Victor 'The Destroyer' Bragg
 1995 Digital Man as Digital Man
 1995 Droid Gunner as Hawks
 1996 Tiger Heart as Hank (uncredited)
 1996 Lone Tiger as Dark Tiger
 1996 Starcrypt as Galleon
 1996 Safety Zone as Marcos
 1996 Alone in the Woods as Kurt
 1997 Bloodsuckers as Reporter
 1997 Executive Target as Vic
 1997 Cyber Vengeance as Thor
 1997 Conan the Adventurer (TV series) as Savann
 1998 The Protector as Gunther
 1999 Hostile Environment as Mike Erikson
 1999 Power Rangers: Lost Galaxy (TV series) as Guardian
 2000 The King's Guard as Angus
 2001 Legion of the Dead as Togaio, Blond Man
 2001 The Silent Force as Unknown (uncredited)
 2003 Beyond the Limits as Big Blond Knight (uncredited)
 2003 The Librarians as Ciro
 2007 D-War as Bounty Hunter #1
 2008 I Am Somebody: No Chance in Hell as Carl
 2008 CarPirates as Unknown 
 2008 1066 as Unknown 
 2009 Immortally Yours as Marshall Pope
 2009 Charlie Valentine as Victor
 2009 Green Street 2: Stand Your Ground as Soccer Player
 2009 Ved verdens ende as Aribert
 2009 The Rogue as Unknown 
 2011 Goy as Martin Teinmann
 2011 Little Klaus Big World as Unknown 
 2012 Money Fight as Matt
 2012 The Sleeper, Deadly Recall as Unknown 
 2014 Black Rose as Black Mask Killer
 2016 Showdown in Manila as Dorn
 2016 Beyond the Game as Unknown 
 2017 Maximum Impact as Ian
 2018 Puppet Master: The Littlest Reich as Strommelson
 2018 Railroad to Hell: A Chinaman's Chance as Carl
 2018 Goy as Martin Teinmann
 2022 Terror on the Prairie as Mr. Samuelson
 2022 Gunfight at Rio Bravo

References

External links

 
 Matthias Hues Interview 2016
 Interview with Matthias Hues

1959 births
Living people
People from Recklinghausen (district)
German male film actors